Bagrat I (died 876), of the Bagratid dynasty, was a presiding prince of Iberia (modern Georgia) from 830 until his death.

Bagrat inherited from his father Ashot I the office of presiding prince of Iberia and the Byzantine title of curopalates. The 10th-century Georgian writer Giorgi Merchule maintains that Bagrat was confirmed as curopalates, following his father, with the agreement of his brothers — Adarnase, and Guaram. Bagrat shared with his brothers the patrimonial holdings, but which lands he actually possessed is not directly indicated in the medieval sources. He probably ruled over a part of Tao and Kola (now in Turkey).

Bagrat I found himself in a constant struggle with the Arabs, the Abasgians and the Kakhetians over the possession of central Iberia (Shida Kartli). In 842, he joined the Arab expedition led by Muhammad ibn Khalid al-Shaybani, the Caliph’s viceroy in the Caucasus, against the rebel emir of Tbilisi, Sahak ibn Ismail, and his Kakhetian allies. In turn, the Caliph recognized Bagrat the prince of Iberia-Kartli. The expedition ended fruitlessly and Bagrat had to make peace with Sahak. In August 853, Bagrat joined the Caliph’s second expedition against Sahak, this time led by Bugha the Turk who took Tbilisi and had the emir executed. As a result, Bagrat was able to regain Shida Kartli, but only for a brief time as the resurgent Abasgians forced him out of this region.

Like his father Ashot, Bagrat was a patron of the large-scale monastic movement in Klarjeti. He granted the monk Grigol Khandzteli material help to build the monastery church at Khandzta and helped build the monasteries of Shatberdi and Ishkhani.

Bagrat I was married to a daughter of the Armenian prince Smbat VIII Bagratuni, and had three sons: his oldest son David who succeeded him as the presiding prince and curopalates; his second oldest son Adarnase who died in the lifetime of his father; and his youngest son Ashot who died in 885.

References

Bagrationi dynasty of Iberia 
Princes of Iberia
876 deaths
Year of birth unknown
Vassal rulers of the Abbasid Caliphate
Kouropalatai